An independent media company that for over 26 years has served as the premier source of news and information for the diplomatic and international communities in Washington, D.C., New York and the global community.

Their reach includes distribution to all 180 foreign embassies in the nation’s capital, as well as the World Bank/IMF, IDB, lawmakers on Capitol Hill, the White House, Pentagon, State Department, federal agencies, Fortune 500 companies, think tanks, universities, centers of learning and various points of influence in Washington, Virginia, Maryland and New York.

The Washington Diplomat is a convener of many high-level events including global virtual conferences, ambassador panels, diplomatic networking events and prominent global media events such as the White House Correspondents’ Association Dinner Pre-Party Reception in partnership with the British Embassy Washington DC and the Embassy of the State of Qatar.

References

External links
 

Newspapers published in Washington, D.C.
Publications established in 1994